Fairground Gaming was an online gaming company traded on the Alternative Investment Market of the London Stock Exchange as FGH.L.

Formed in 2005, Fairground's primary business was in the online casino sector, but it also operated two online poker cardrooms. In June 2006, the company acquired the Spin Palace Group for approximately $65 million.

Casinos owned by the group included:
Spin Palace Casino
Ruby Fortune Casino
Mummys Gold Casino
Piggs Casino
Cabaret Club
Jackpots in a Flash

The poker rooms were:
Spin Palace Poker
Poker333

All casinos in the group were powered by Microgaming software, members of the ECOGRA organisation and licensed by the Kahnawake Gaming Commission.

As of October 2006 the company no longer took United States customers due to passing of the Unlawful Internet Gambling Enforcement Act of 2006. Subsequently, the company was liquidated.

Notes

Defunct gambling companies
Gambling companies established in 2005
Gambling companies disestablished in 2006
Internet properties established in 2005
Internet properties disestablished in 2006
Companies formerly listed on the London Stock Exchange